Hellriegel may refer to:

Hermann Hellriegel (1831–1895) was a German agricultural chemist
Jan Hellriegel is a singer/songwriter based in Auckland, New Zealand
Thomas Hellriegel (born 1971) is a German Ironman Triathlete
Standschütze Hellriegel M1915 an early Austrian Submachine gun.